Unguja South Region, Zanzibar South Region or South Zanzibar Region (Mkoa wa Unguja Kusini in Swahili) is one of the 31 regions of Tanzania. The region is comparable in size to the combined land area of the nation state of Kiribati. and the administrative region is located entirely on the island of Zanzibar. Unguja South Region is bordered on three sides to the south by Indian Ocean, northeast by Unguja North Region and northwest by Mjini Magharibi Region. The regional capital is the town of Koani. According to the 2012 census, the region has a total population of 94,504.

Administrative divisions

Districts
Unguja South Region is divided into two districts, each administered by a council:

Constituencies
For parliamentary elections, Tanzania is divided into constituencies. As of the 2010 elections Zanzibar Central/South Region had five constituencies:

 Kati District
 Chwaka Constituency
 Koani Constituency
 Uzini Constituency
 Kusini District
 Makunduchi Constituency
 Muyuni Constituency

References

External links

 
Regions of Tanzania
Geography of Zanzibar